Arndell School is a specialised school funded by the NSW Department of Education and Training for students with emotional and behavioural difficulties. It works in partnership with  the Coral Tree Family Services and is located in the Macquarie Hospital grounds in North Ryde.

Staff from Arndell School and Coral Tree Family Service work collaboratively, with families and home schools to address the social, educational and behavioural needs of individual students.

The school provides educational programs with an emphasis on literacy and numeracy for a maximum of 35 students aged from 4.5 to 12 years (K to Y6).  Five classes operate at the school.

References

External links
Arndell School
Coral Tree Family Services

Special schools in Australia
Public primary schools in Sydney
Ryde, New South Wales